Andreas Hagara (born 19 May 1964) is an Austrian yacht racer who competed in the 1992 Summer Olympics and in the 1996 Summer Olympics.   His brother also sailed, Roman Hagara.

References

1964 births
Living people
Austrian male sailors (sport)
Olympic sailors of Austria
Sailors at the 1992 Summer Olympics – Tornado
Sailors at the 1996 Summer Olympics – Tornado
Tornado class world champions
World champions in sailing for Austria